Andrew "Andy" Anderson (died 1989) was an American baseball player in the Negro leagues.  He served as a catcher for Satchel Paige in 1927 with the Chattanooga Black Lookouts.   Anderson worked as a musician and spent 20 years in the Negro leagues. He played for a number of teams including the Mohawk Giants and Syracuse Black Chiefs. Anderson died in 1989.

References

Schenectady Mohawk Giants players
1989 deaths
Year of birth missing